None is an EP by Cloak of Altering, independently released on November 18, 2013.

Track listing

Personnel
Adapted from the None liner notes.
 Maurice de Jong (as Mories) – vocals, instruments, recording, cover art

Release history

References

External links 
 
 None at Bandcamp

2013 EPs
Cloak of Altering albums